Gerhard Roth (24 June 1942 – 8 February 2022) was an Austrian writer.

Life
Roth was born in Graz. The son of a medical practitioner, Roth, too, originally wanted to study medicine himself, but soon turned his attention to literature. Initially, he earned his living as a computer programmer.

He was a freelance writer from 1976. From 1973 to 1978, he was member of the Grazer Autorenversammlung before he moved to Hamburg in 1979. Since 1986, he divided his time between Vienna and Styria.

He won many literature prizes, among which are the literature prize of Styria (1976), the Alfred Döblin Prize (1983), and the Bruno-Kreisky-Prize (2002). In 1995, he was awarded the Golden Romy for his screenplay of Schnellschuss. He was also the recipient of the 2012 Jakob-Wassermann-Literaturpreis.

Roth died on 8 February 2022, at the age of 79.

Work
Roth referred to himself as "someone obsessed with writing in the best sense." In the focus is the hero, struggling in vain, to whom the world appears to be a torturous, intolerable state. Often Roth externally couched his writings in the form of a crime novel, in which he emphasised the unravelling of the hidden, in a figurative sense.

The focus of his main opus, Die Archive des Schweigens, is the re-appraisal of Austrian history in today's political and social systems.

Writings

Die Archive des Schweigens. Cycle of novels with the following parts:
Der Stille Ozean, 1980
Landläufiger Tod, 1984
Am Abgrund, 1986
Der Untersuchungsrichter, 1988
Im tiefen Österreich, 1990
Die Geschichte der Dunkelheit, 1991
Eine Reise in das Innere von Wien, 1991
Novels:
die autobiographie des albert einstein, 1972
Der Wille zur Krankheit, 1973
Der große Horizont, 1974
Ein neuer Morgen, 1976
Winterreise, 1978
Die schönen Bilder beim Trabrennen, 1982
Der See, 1995
Der Plan, 1998
Der Berg, 2000
Der Strom, 2002
Das Labyrinth, 2004
Das Alphabet der Zeit, 2007
Narrations
Der Ausbruch des Weltkriegs, 1972
Circus Saluti, 1981
Das Töten des Bussards, 1982
Dramas
Lichtenberg, 1973
Sehnsucht, 1977
Dämmerung, 1978
Erinnerungen an die Menschheit, 1985
Franz Lindner und er selber, 1987
Fremd in Wien, 1993
Autobiography
Das Alphabet der Zeit, August 2007
Essays
Über Bienen. (German/Japanese; with photos by Franz Killmeyer). Folio, Wien und Bozen 1996.
Das doppelköpfige Österreich, 1995
Gsellmanns Weltmaschine (with Franz Killmeyer)
several radio dramas and screenplays (in some cases of his own novels)

Bibliography
All references are in German.
P. Ensberg und H. Schreckenberger: G. Roth, 1994;
M. Baltl (Ed.): G. Roth, 1995;
U. Schütte: Auf der Spur der Vergessenen. G. Roth und seine Archive des Schweigens, 1997.

References

External links

Review of the book "Das Alphabet der Zeit" 
"Gerhard Roth's Orkus Novels The Lake, The Plan, The Mountain, and The Stream as Murder Mysteries" by Pamela S. Saur, Clues: A Journal of Detection 29.1 (2011)

1942 births
2022 deaths
Writers from Graz
Austrian male writers
Austrian screenwriters
Marietta and Friedrich Torberg Medal recipients